The 1994–95 NBA season was the 25th season of the National Basketball Association for the franchise based in Cleveland, Ohio. This was also the team's first season playing at the Gund Arena. During the off-season, the Cavaliers signed free agents Michael Cage, and Tony Campbell. Despite losing both Brad Daugherty with a back injury, and Gerald Wilkins with a ruptured Achilles tendon for the entire season, the Cavaliers posted an 11-game winning streak in December, which led them to a 20–8 start, and held a 28–19 record at the All-Star break. However, they played below .500 for the remainder of the season as Mark Price missed 34 games with a broken wrist. Price would soon return, as the Cavaliers finished 4th in the Central Division with a 43–39 record.

Price led the team with 15.8 points and 7.0 assists per game, while Tyrone Hill averaged 13.8 points and led the team with 10.9 rebounds per game, and was selected for the 1995 NBA All-Star Game, and backup point guard Terrell Brandon, who stepped up in Price's absence, provided the team with 13.3 points, 5.4 assists and 1.6 steals per game. In addition, second-year forward Chris Mills became the team's starting small forward, averaging 12.3 points per game, while Hot Rod Williams provided with 12.6 points, 6.9 rebounds and 1.4 blocks per game, Bobby Phills contributed 11.0 points and 1.4 steals per game, Cage provided with 5.0 points and 6.9 rebounds per game, and Danny Ferry contributed 7.5 points per game off the bench.

However, without Brandon, who suffered a leg injury during the final month of the regular season, the Cavaliers would lose to the New York Knicks, 3–1 in the Eastern Conference First Round of the playoffs. Following the season, Price was traded to the Washington Bullets after nine seasons in Cleveland, while Williams was dealt to the Phoenix Suns, Wilkins left in the 1995 NBA Expansion Draft, Campbell was released to free agency, and John Battle retired.

For the season, the Cavaliers changed their primary logo, which showed a basketball going into a net on a black square, and changed their uniforms adding black and light blue to their color scheme. Their logo would remain in use until 2003, while the uniforms were slightly redesigned in 1997.

Key Dates:

Offseason

Free agents

Trades

Draft picks

 1st round pick (#16) traded to Golden State in Tyrone Hill deal. Used to draft Clifford Rozier.

Roster

Roster Notes
 Center Brad Daugherty missed the entire season due to a back injury.
 Guard/forward Gerald Wilkins missed the entire season due to a ruptured Achilles tendon.

Regular season

Season standings

Record vs. opponents

Game log

Regular season

|- align="center" bgcolor="#ccffcc"
| 1
| November 5
| @ Charlotte
| W 115–107
| Price (27)
|
|
| Charlotte Coliseum23,698
| 1–0
|- align="center" bgcolor="#ffcccc"
| 2
| November 8, 19948:00p.m. EST
| Houston
| L 98–100
| Brandon (19)
| Williams (10)
| Brandon, Phills, Price (7)
| Gund Arena20,562
| 1–1
|- align="center" bgcolor="#ccffcc"
| 3
| November 10
| Milwaukee
| W 108–88
| Price (18)
|
|
| Gund Arena19,203
| 2–1
|- align="center" bgcolor="#ffcccc"
| 4
| November 12
| Indiana
| L 86–93
| Price (15)
|
|
| Gund Arena20,401
| 2–2
|- align="center" bgcolor="#ccffcc"
| 5
| November 15
| Charlotte
| W 89–86 (OT)
| Hill (22)
|
|
| Gund Arena19,959
| 3–2
|- align="center" bgcolor="#ccffcc"
| 6
| November 17
| @ Portland
| W 81–80
| Price (30)
|
|
| Memorial Coliseum12,888
| 4–2
|- align="center" bgcolor="#ffcccc"
| 7
| November 18
| @ L.A. Lakers
| L 80–82
| Williams (16)
|
|
| Great Western Forum10,177
| 4–3
|- align="center" bgcolor="#ffcccc"
| 8
| November 20
| @ Sacramento
| L 88–96
| Williams (17)
|
|
| ARCO Arena17,317
| 4–4
|- align="center" bgcolor="#ccffcc"
| 9
| November 22
| Minnesota
| W 112–79
| Price (17)
|
|
| Gund Arena19,125
| 5–4
|- align="center" bgcolor="#ffcccc"
| 10
| November 23
| @ Miami
| L 87–100
| Mills, Price (17)
|
|
| Miami Arena14,498
| 5–5
|- align="center" bgcolor="#ccffcc"
| 11
| November 25
| @ Washington
| W 96–94
| Hill (25)
|
|
| USAir Arena12,756
| 6–5
|- align="center" bgcolor="#ccffcc"
| 12
| November 26
| Golden State
| W 101–87
| Price (31)
|
|
| Gund Arena20,562
| 7–5
|- align="center" bgcolor="#ccffcc"
| 13
| November 30
| L.A. Lakers
| W 117–79
| Brandon, Campbell, Price (16)
|
|
| Gund Arena19,014
| 8–5

|- align="center" bgcolor="#ccffcc"
| 14
| December 1
| @ Milwaukee
| W 93–87
| Price (17)
|
|
| Bradley Center13,648
| 9–5
|- align="center" bgcolor="#ffcccc"
| 15
| December 3
| Philadelphia
| L 78–83
| Price (18)
|
|
| Gund Arena20,089
| 9–6
|- align="center" bgcolor="#ffcccc"
| 16
| December 6
| Orlando
| L 97–114
| Brandon, Williams (14)
|
|
| Gund Arena20,562
| 9–7
|- align="center" bgcolor="#ffcccc"
| 17
| December 7
| @ Orlando
| L 75–90
| Mills (14)
|
|
| Orlando Arena16,010
| 9–8
|- align="center" bgcolor="#ccffcc"
| 18
| December 9
| @ Boston
| W 96–89
| Williams (20)
|
|
| Boston Garden14,890
| 10–8
|- align="center" bgcolor="#ccffcc"
| 19
| December 10
| Detroit
| W 97–89
| Mills (17)
|
|
| Gund Arena19,129
| 11–8
|- align="center" bgcolor="#ccffcc"
| 20
| December 13
| Indiana
| W 90–83
| Mills (17)
|
|
| Gund Arena19,191
| 12–8
|- align="center" bgcolor="#ccffcc"
| 21
| December 14
| @ New Jersey
| W 95–88 (2OT)
| Williams (20)
|
|
| Brendan Byrne Arena9,027
| 13–8
|- align="center" bgcolor="#ccffcc"
| 22
| December 16
| @ Philadelphia
| W 84–80
| Brandon (15)
|
|
| CoreStates Spectrum9,830
| 14–8
|- align="center" bgcolor="#ccffcc"
| 23
| December 19
| @ Chicago
| W 77–63
| Williams (18)
|
|
| United Center22,301
| 15–8
|- align="center" bgcolor="#ccffcc"
| 24
| December 22
| @ New York
| W 93–90
| Phills (24)
|
|
| Madison Square Garden19,763
| 16–8
|- align="center" bgcolor="#ccffcc"
| 25
| December 23
| New Jersey
| W 80–75
| Hill (18)
|
|
| Gund Arena20,562
| 17–8
|- align="center" bgcolor="#ccffcc"
| 26
| December 26
| Boston
| W 123–102
| Price (36)
|
|
| Gund Arena20,562
| 18–8
|- align="center" bgcolor="#ccffcc"
| 27
| December 28
| Washington
| W 91–75
| Phills (22)
|
|
| Gund Arena20,562
| 19–8
|- align="center" bgcolor="#ccffcc"
| 28
| December 30
| Atlanta
| W 87–85
| Price (30)
|
|
| Gund Arena20,562
| 20–8

|- align="center" bgcolor="#ffcccc"
| 29
| January 4
| Seattle
| L 85–116
| Williams (17)
|
|
| Gund Arena20,562
| 20–9
|- align="center" bgcolor="#ffcccc"
| 30
| January 6
| New York
| L 93–103
| Hill (26)
|
|
| Gund Arena20,562
| 20–10
|- align="center" bgcolor="#ccffcc"
| 31
| January 7
| Chicago
| W 92–78
| Brandon (24)
|
|
| Gund Arena20,562
| 21–10
|- align="center" bgcolor="#ffcccc"
| 32
| January 10
| Charlotte
| L 108–116 (OT)
| Hill (23)
|
|
| Gund Arena20,562
| 21–11
|- align="center" bgcolor="#ccffcc"
| 33
| January 12
| @ Phoenix
| W 107–96
| Brandon (30)
|
|
| America West Arena19,023
| 22–11
|- align="center" bgcolor="#ccffcc"
| 34
| January 14
| @ Golden State
| W 103–97 (OT)
| Hill (20)
|
|
| Oakland-Alameda County Coliseum Arena15,025
| 23–11
|- align="center" bgcolor="#ffcccc"
| 35
| January 17
| @ Seattle
| L 91–115
| Brandon (20)
|
|
| Tacoma Dome12,914
| 23–12
|- align="center" bgcolor="#ffcccc"
| 36
| January 18
| @ L.A. Clippers
| L 83–92
| Mills (19)
|
|
| Los Angeles Memorial Sports Arena6,695
| 23–13
|- align="center" bgcolor="#ffcccc"
| 37
| January 20
| @ Utah
| L 84–94
| Brandon (24)
|
|
| Delta Center19,911
| 23–14
|- align="center" bgcolor="#ccffcc"
| 38
| January 21
| @ Denver
| W 101–100 (2OT)
| Mills (20)
|
|
| McNichols Sports Arena17,171
| 24–14
|- align="center" bgcolor="#ccffcc"
| 39
| January 23
| L.A. Clippers
| W 90–68
| Hill (26)
|
|
| Gund Arena20,187
| 25–14
|- align="center" bgcolor="#ccffcc"
| 40
| January 26
| @ Atlanta
| W 77–68
| Hill, Mills (14)
|
|
| The Omni10,760
| 26–14
|- align="center" bgcolor="#ffcccc"
| 41
| January 27
| Portland
| L 77–87
| Williams (14)
|
|
| Gund Arena20,562
| 26–15
|- align="center" bgcolor="#ffcccc"
| 42
| January 30
| Phoenix
| L 82–89
| Brandon (20)
|
|
| Gund Arena20,562
| 26–16

|- align="center" bgcolor="#ffcccc"
| 43
| February 1
| @ Indiana
| L 82–101
| Williams (14)
|
|
| Market Square Arena13,972
| 26–17
|- align="center" bgcolor="#ffcccc"
| 44
| February 2
| @ Detroit
| L 83–85
| Brandon (15)
|
|
| The Palace of Auburn Hills13,286
| 26–18
|- align="center" bgcolor="#ccffcc"
| 45
| February 4
| Indiana
| W 82–73
| Williams (19)
|
|
| Gund Arena20,562
| 27–18
|- align="center" bgcolor="#ccffcc"
| 46
| February 7
| Philadelphia
| W 90–84
| Hill, Williams (16)
|
|
| Gund Arena20,130
| 28–18
|- align="center" bgcolor="#ffcccc"
| 47
| February 8
| @ Boston
| L 67–75
| Brandon (19)
|
|
| Boston Garden14,890
| 28–19
|- align="center"
|colspan="9" bgcolor="#bbcaff"|All-Star Break
|- style="background:#cfc;"
|- bgcolor="#bbffbb"
|- align="center" bgcolor="#ccffcc"
| 48
| February 15
| Orlando
| W 100–99 (OT)
| Brandon (31)
|
|
| Gund Arena20,562
| 29–19
|- align="center" bgcolor="#ccffcc"
| 49
| February 16
| @ Milwaukee
| W 106–85
| Mills (23)
|
|
| Bradley Center13,498
| 30–19
|- align="center" bgcolor="#ccffcc"
| 50
| February 18
| @ New Jersey
| W 82–75
| Mills (23)
|
|
| Brendan Byrne Arena15,652
| 31–19
|- align="center" bgcolor="#ffcccc"
| 51
| February 20
| Miami
| L 96–103
| Williams (20)
|
|
| Gund Arena20,562
| 31–20
|- align="center" bgcolor="#ccffcc"
| 52
| February 21
| @ New York
| W 99–91
| Ferry (20)
|
|
| Madison Square Garden19,763
| 32–20
|- align="center" bgcolor="#ccffcc"
| 53
| February 25
| New Jersey
| W 105–102
| Ferry (24)
|
|
| Gund Arena20,562
| 33–20
|- align="center" bgcolor="#ffcccc"
| 54
| February 27, 19958:30p.m. EST
| @ Houston
| L 78–86
| Brandon (26)
| Cage (10)
| Brandon (4)
| The Summit14,253
| 33–21
|- align="center" bgcolor="#ffcccc"
| 55
| February 28
| @ San Antonio
| L 83–100
| Brandon (17)
|
|
| Alamodome15,546
| 33–22

|- align="center" bgcolor="#ffcccc"
| 56
| March 2
| @ Dallas
| L 84–90
| Mills (16)
|
|
| Reunion Arena12,194
| 33–23
|- align="center" bgcolor="#ffcccc"
| 57
| March 4
| New York
| L 76–89
| Williams (20)
|
|
| Gund Arena20,562
| 33–24
|- align="center" bgcolor="#ccffcc"
| 58
| March 7
| Detroit
| W 89–81
| Mills (24)
|
|
| Gund Arena20,562
| 34–24
|- align="center" bgcolor="#ffcccc"
| 59
| March 9
| San Antonio
| L 98–100
| Brandon (24)
|
|
| Gund Arena20,562
| 34–25
|- align="center" bgcolor="#ffcccc"
| 60
| March 10
| @ Chicago
| L 76–99
| Hill (13)
|
|
| United Center22,362
| 34–26
|- align="center" bgcolor="#ccffcc"
| 61
| March 12
| @ Philadelphia
| W 92–72
| Brandon, Ferry, Mills (14)
|
|
| CoreStates Spectrum10,221
| 35–26
|- align="center" bgcolor="#ccffcc"
| 62
| March 16
| Utah
| W 93–85
| Phills (24)
|
|
| Gund Arena20,562
| 36–26
|- align="center" bgcolor="#ffcccc"
| 63
| March 17
| @ Minnesota
| L 77–80
| Price (18)
|
|
| Target Center14,222
| 36–27
|- align="center" bgcolor="#ffcccc"
| 64
| March 19
| @ Washington
| L 90–96
| Price (16)
|
|
| USAir Arena17,110
| 36–28
|- align="center" bgcolor="#ffcccc"
| 65
| March 20
| Dallas
| L 100–102 (2OT)
| Hill (29)
|
|
| Gund Arena20,562
| 36–29
|- align="center" bgcolor="#ccffcc"
| 66
| March 22
| Sacramento
| W 101–89
| Price (23)
|
|
| Gund Arena20,562
| 37–29
|- align="center" bgcolor="#ccffcc"
| 67
| March 24
| Atlanta
| W 75–74
| Hill (24)
|
|
| Gund Arena20,562
| 38–29
|- align="center" bgcolor="#ffcccc"
| 68
| March 25
| @ Charlotte
| L 97–105
| Mills (26)
|
|
| Charlotte Coliseum23,698
| 38–30
|- align="center" bgcolor="#ffcccc"
| 69
| March 29
| @ Indiana
| L 96–107
| Mills (22)
|
|
| Market Square Arena16,619
| 38–31
|- align="center" bgcolor="#ccffcc"
| 70
| March 31
| Washington
| W 98–88
| Mills (24)
|
|
| Gund Arena20,562
| 39–31

|- align="center" bgcolor="#ffcccc"
| 71
| April 2
| Denver
| L 101–104
| Price (21)
|
|
| Gund Arena20,562
| 39–32
|- align="center" bgcolor="#ffcccc"
| 72
| April 4
| Boston
| L 92–97
| Phills (17)
|
|
| Gund Arena20,562
| 39–33
|- align="center" bgcolor="#ffcccc"
| 73
| April 5
| @ Atlanta
| L 87–96
| Williams (14)
|
|
| The Omni12,539
| 39–34
|- align="center" bgcolor="#ffcccc"
| 74
| April 7
| @ Chicago
| L 88–97
| Phills (22)
|
|
| United Center23,664
| 39–35
|- align="center" bgcolor="#ccffcc"
| 75
| April 9
| Chicago
| W 79–78
| Price (20)
|
|
| Gund Arena20,562
| 40–35
|- align="center" bgcolor="#ffcccc"
| 76
| April 11
| @ Orlando
| L 90–107
| Hill (24)
|
|
| Orlando Arena16,010
| 40–36
|- align="center" bgcolor="#ffcccc"
| 77
| April 13
| @ Miami
| L 84–85
| Price (20)
|
|
| Miami Arena14,311
| 40–37
|- align="center" bgcolor="#ccffcc"
| 78
| April 14
| Atlanta
| W 83–70
| Hill, Williams (16)
|
|
| Gund Arena20,562
| 41–37
|- align="center" bgcolor="#ffcccc"
| 79
| April 18
| @ Detroit
| L 76–85
| Phills (17)
|
|
| The Palace of Auburn Hills17,203
| 41–38
|- align="center" bgcolor="#ccffcc"
| 80
| April 19
| Miami
| W 103–82
| Hill (21)
|
|
| Gund Arena20,562
| 42–38
|- align="center" bgcolor="#ccffcc"
| 81
| April 21
| Milwaukee
| W 103–82
| Williams (24)
|
|
| Gund Arena20,562
| 42–38
|- align="center" bgcolor="#ffcccc"
| 82
| April 23
| @ Charlotte
| L 72–97
| Phills (13)
|
|
| Charlotte Coliseum23,698
| 43–39

Playoffs

|- align="center" bgcolor="#ffcccc"
| 1
| April 27
| @ New York
| L 79–103
| Danny Ferry (20)
| Tyrone Hill (8)
| Mark Price (4)
| Madison Square Garden19,763
| 0–1
|- align="center" bgcolor="#ccffcc"
| 2
| April 29
| @ New York
| W 90–84
| Mills, Phills (21)
| Hot Rod Williams (6)
| Mark Price (7)
| Madison Square Garden19,763
| 1–1
|- align="center" bgcolor="#ffcccc"
| 3
| May 1
| New York
| L 81–83
| Mark Price (21)
| Michael Cage (8)
| Mark Price (6)
| Gund Arena19,352
| 1–2
|- align="center" bgcolor="#ffcccc"
| 4
| May 4
| New York
| L 80–93
| Bobby Phills (20)
| Hot Rod Williams (7)
| Mark Price (9)
| Gund Arena18,575
| 1–3
|-

Player stats

Regular season

Playoffs

Player Statistics Citation:

Awards and records

Awards

Records

Milestones

All-Star

Transactions

Trades

Free agents

Development League

References

 Cleveland Cavaliers on Database Basketball
 Cleveland Cavaliers on Basketball Reference

Cleveland Cavaliers seasons
Cleve
Cleve